Balasuriyage Steven Perera (born 31 March 1924 – died 24 June 1982 as බී. එස්. පෙරේරා) [Sinhala]), popularly as B. S. Perera, was an actor in Sri Lankan cinema and theater as well as a director and singer. One of the earliest pillars and popular comedy artists ever in Sri Lankan film history, Perera had a career spanned about three decades. He holds the record for the highest number of films acted by a Sri Lankan well over 180 films.

Personal life
Perera was born on 31 March 1924 in Colombo. His father was Balasuriyage Adwin Perera. He was a talented artist in the Tower Hall era. He received his primary education at Maligakanda Government School, Colombo (currently known as Mahinda Maha Vidyalaya, Maligakanda) and later studied at Sangaraja Vidyalaya, Maradana (currently known as Sri Sangaraja Central College, Colombo 10). In 1939, Perera joined the Army and joined the Colombo Municipal Council at the end of World War II.

Before entering cinema, Perera worked as a Tram car driver. Due to an accident he lost part of the vision. Although he underwent eye surgery, he suffered a tear in his eye causing a strabismus condition. After the accident, he served as a trolley bus inspector.

Perera was married to B.A.D. Gnanawathi. The couple had five daughters - elder Sriyani, younger Sriyani, Brinda, Rajathi, Princy - and two sons - Sunil Wesley and Ravindra. Sunil Wesley was a professional commercial artist and singer. Second son Ravindra has acted in few films such as Yakadaya and Duppathage Hithawatha and then retired from the Chilaw Railway Department.

Perera died on 24 June 1982 in Chilaw after a brief illness at the age of 58.

Career
From the little age, he had performed in Tower Hall stage dramas. He acted as "Mohottala" in the stage play Sri Wickrama, which was his only Tower Hall acting. During his work as a tram car driver, he produced the stage play Nikan Awa to donate to the Urban Council Funeral Association. Then he produced the plays Samadaththara, Lankapura and Saliya Ashokamala. Strabismus condition made the fortune of becoming a film actor. One of his friends, C.M. Rupasinghe introduced Perera to popular film producer S. Sivanandan. At that time, Sivanandan was the assistant director in film Dheewarayo.

He acted in an English film before enter to Sinhala cinema. His first Sinhala film was Roddy Kella directed by Sirisena Wimalaweera. However, due to the sudden death of Wimalaweera, the film shooting stopped. His first screened film appearance came through 1964 blockbuster film Dheewarayo in a minor role as a singer. The most memorable character played by Perera was as a patient in the film Senasuma Kothanada. His comic roles were extremely popular, some of them include, Chandiya, Thushara, Hari Pudumai, Hondata Hondai, Mahadena Muththa and Ara Soyza. He also acted in the Sri Lankan Tamil film Mamiyar Veedu.

In 1955, he worked as the music director in the film Perakadoru Bena directed by A.B. Raja. In 1974, he directed and produced the film Rodi Gama. In 1974, he was awarded with Deepashika Award for acting most number of Sinhala films. He emerged from the comic strip and acted as a character actor in few films such as Subhani, Bandura Mal, Rana Derana and Ridee Thella.

After his death in 1982, twenty eight films were screened as posthumous releases.

Filmography

As actor

References

External links

1924 births
1982 deaths
Sri Lankan male film actors
Sinhalese male actors
Sri Lankan male stage actors